"The Motto" is a song by Dutch disc jockey Tiësto and American singer and songwriter Ava Max from the former's upcoming eighth studio album, Drive (2023). The song was penned by Tiësto, Max, Claudia Valentina, Lostboy, Pablo Bowman and Sarah Blanchard, while produced by the DJ and Lostboy. It was released as the third single from the album for digital download and streaming in various countries by Atlantic and Musical Freedom on 4 November 2021. "The Motto" is a fusion of dance, EDM and pop song, showcasing empowering lyrics that emphasize "doing you, having a good time and letting the world know". Upon its release, the release of the song was well-received by music critics, who praised the music and production of the song, the collaborative effort between the artists and the vocal delivery of Max. At the 2022 MTV Europe Music Awards, the song received a nomination in the category for the Best Collaboration.

"The Motto" achieved commercial success, reaching the number one position in the Czech Republic and Poland as well as the top 10 in 18 other countries, including in Belgium, Canada, Germany, Netherlands and Switzerland. The song also reached number one on the US Billboard Dance/Mix Show Airplay chart and number two on the Dance/Electronic Songs ranking. It was certified gold in four countries as well as platinum in seven countries, including in Brazil, Portugal and the United States. The song also received double platinum certifications from Music Canada in Canada and the Polish Society of the Phonographic Industry (ZPAV) in Poland. Two official music videos for the song premiered on Tiësto's YouTube channel on 4 November 2021 and 11 March 2022, respectively. The first video depicts Tiësto and Max time traveling and partying in the 1920s, with the end being inspired by the 1980 psychological horror film The Shining.

Background and composition 

A few days prior to its release, Tiësto and Max announced "The Motto" as their collaboration and confirmed the song's release date for 4 November 2021. The song was written by Tiësto (Tijs Verwest), Max (Amanda Ava Koci), Claudia Valentina, Lostboy (Peter Rycroft), Pablo Bowman and Sarah Blanchard, with the production completed by Tiësto and Lostboy. It was released for digital download and streaming in various countries by Atlantic and Musical Freedom on the scheduled date as the third single from Tiësto's upcoming eighth studio album Drive (2023). Talking about the song, Tiësto stated, "Ava is such an exciting young talent and her beautiful voice adds such depth to ['the song']", while Max added, "When [he] shared this record with me, I fell in love and couldn't stop playing it." Musically, "The Motto" is a dance, EDM and pop song, with an eurodance production. According to Max, the song has an empowerment message and is about "doing you, having a good time and letting the world know".

Critical reception 

"The Motto" was met with widespread critical acclaim from music critics after its release. Ellie Mullins for We Rave You complimented the artists' collaboration, commenting that "Max's pop prowess shines spectacularly against Tiësto's signature dance soundscape". Bradley Stern of MuuMuse labeled the song as a "dance floor anthem", writing that "Max is […] refusing to let her grip on the industry loose for even a moment, this time in the form of a tag-team with the legendary Tiësto". JB from Fun Radio similarly commended the song as an "electro anthem", commenting that "[it] will remind you of [Tiësto's] prominent 'The Business' [2020], with an inflated bass line". A writer of Dancing Astronaut likewise found the song as "a welcome return to the swagged out sounds of 2020's 'The Business'". Gabriel Krongold for EDM Tunes acclaimed the song's beat, adding that "Max mixes her enthralling vocals with Tiësto's electronic magic to make a track that'll bring most everyone off their feet". A writer of Rádió 1 characterised the song as a "massive-sounding", annotating that Tiësto's "characterful house style" with Max's "brilliant vocals" created an "unbeatable pair". Another writer of Radio Eska noted the song as a "speeding banger" and "party anthem", which according to him "will not let anyone stand still". Michael Rädel of Männer considered the song an "earworm" and a "standout" from the "current monotony" of the charts. Writing for Maxim, Jordan Riefe held the view that the song "represent[ed] an evolution in [Max's] creative process". "The Motto" received a nomination in the category for the Best Collaboration at the 2022 MTV Europe Music Awards, with Max being one of three ethnic Albanian artists nominated in the same category. The song was further ranked among the most popular songs on Apple Music in 2022.

Commercial performance 

"The Motto" charted in several English-speaking countries after its release. In the United States, the song reached number 45 on the Billboard Hot 100 issue dated 9 April 2022, standing as Tiësto's sixth and Max's fourth entry in the ranking. It reached number one on the Dance/Mix Show Airplay, number two on the Dance/Electronic Songs and number 16 on the Mainstream Top 40 rankings. The song received a platinum certification from the Recording Industry Association of America (RIAA) for selling more than 1,000,000 equivalent copies in the US. In Canada, the song reached number six on the Canadian Hot 100 and entered the top 25 on the Canada CHR/Top 40 and Canada Hot AC rankings. It received a double platinum certification from Music Canada (MC) for shifting more than 1,000,000 units in Canada. In Australia, the song peaked at number 22 on the ARIA Singles Chart and received a gold certification from the Australian Recording Industry Association (ARIA) for selling more than 35,000 copies. The song reached number 12 on the UK Singles Chart in the United Kingdom and number six on the Irish Singles Chart in Ireland. It received a gold certification from the British Phonographic Industry (BPI) for shifting more than 400,000 copies in the UK. "The Motto" also entered the charts in multiple other countries around the world. Topping the charts in the Czech Republic and Poland, the song reached the top 10 in Austria, Belgium, Germany, Greece, Hungary, Lithuania, Luxembourg, Netherlands, Nicaragua, Puerto Rico, Romania, Russia, Switzerland and Ukraine. It further peaked within the top 100 in Argentina, the Commonwealth of Independent States (CIS), Chile, Colombia, Denmark, Dominican Republic, El Salvador, Finland, France, Iceland, Italy, Norway, Panama, Portugal, South Africa, Slovakia and Sweden. The song received gold certifications in Denmark, France, Germany and Italy as well as platinum certifications in Austria, Brazil, Norway, Poland and Portugal.

Music video 

To accompany the release, a music video for "The Motto" debuted to Tiësto's official YouTube channel on 4 November 2021, with a broadcast premiere on MTV Live, MTVU and ViacomCBS Times Square billboards. Directed by Christian Breslauer, the three-minute and 31-second video revolves around Tiësto and Ava Max time traveling and partying in the 1920s. It opens with a sequence of Max leaving a hotel party and a close-up shot of her entering an elevator with a glass of champagne in hand. She then presses the button for the first floor and spills the glass of champagne on the elevator control panel, which she manages to render inoperable. Next, the elevator deposits her in the lobby of a hotel in the Jazz Age and Max starts to dance and hang out around the lobby, which is filled with a number of people. After taking a luggage cart to another part of the hotel, she then joins Tiësto at a banquet, which she promptly crashes and this causes all the guests to clap and dance with her. The following sequence shows everyone posing for a group photo, which becomes a sepia-toned photograph appearing framed in the hotel lobby in the present-day hotel, as a reference to the American psychological horror film The Shining (1980). As the video ends, Max walks across the lobby in front of the photo, while telling someone on the phone, "Man, last night was crazy. It felt like a dream!"

For further promotion, a second music video for "The Motto" premiered on 11 March 2022 and was filmed in Los Angeles, California. The two-minute and 42-second video was directed and choreographed Charm La Donna and includes appearances from Cache Melvin, Caho Kitaori, Candice Savage, Darrion Gallegos, Gato Waddell, Honey Balenciaga, Joseph John Perez and Maggie Anne Wade as dancers. A third, drag version of the music video was published on Max's official YouTube channel, with scenes featuring appearances of Derrick Barry, Jaida Essence Hall, Kameron Michaels and Pangina Heals.

Track listing 

Digital download and streaming
"The Motto"2:44

Digital download and streamingRemixes
"The Motto"2:44
"The Motto" (Tiësto VIP Remix)3:26
"The Motto" (Robin Schulz Remix)2:37
"The Motto" (Öwnboss Remix)3:13
"The Motto" (Nathan Dawe Remix)3:01

Credits and personnel 

Credits adapted from Spotify.

Tiësto (Tijs Verwest)lead artist, producing, songwriting
Ava Max (Amanda Ava Koci)lead artist, songwriting
Claudia Valentinasongwriting
Lostboy (Peter Rycroft)producing, songwriting
Pablo Bowmansongwriting
Sarah Blanchardsongwriting

Charts

Weekly charts

Monthly charts

Year-end charts

Certifications

Release history

See also 
List of Dutch Top 40 number-one singles of 2022
List of number-one dance airplay hits of 2022 (U.S.)
List of number-one singles of 2022 (Poland)
List of number-one songs of the 2020s (Czech Republic)

References 

2021 singles
2021 songs
Tiësto songs
Ava Max songs
American electronic dance music songs
American pop songs
Atlantic Records singles
Dance music songs
Dutch electronic dance music songs
Dutch pop songs
Dutch Top 40 number-one singles
Number-one singles in Poland
Number-one singles in the Czech Republic
Songs written by Ava Max
Songs written by Pablo Bowman
Songs written by Sarah Blanchard
Songs written by Tiësto
Songs written by Peter Rycroft